Alireza Katiraei, (born March 5, 1976 in Qom), is a retired professional Iranian karateka. Katiraei won gold medal in 1998 Asian Games and 2002 Asian Games.

References

External links 
 Alireza Katiraei Profile in Karate Records

1976 births
Living people
People from Qom
Iranian male karateka
Asian Games medalists in karate
Asian Games gold medalists for Iran
Karateka at the 1998 Asian Games
Karateka at the 2002 Asian Games
World Games bronze medalists
Medalists at the 1998 Asian Games
Medalists at the 2002 Asian Games
Competitors at the 1997 World Games
20th-century Iranian people
21st-century Iranian people